Burckhardt, or (de) Bourcard in French, is a family of the Basel patriciate, descended from Christoph (Stoffel) Burckhardt (1490–1578), a merchant in cloth and silk originally from Münstertal, Black Forest, who received Basel citizenship in 1523, and became a member of the Grand Council of Basel-Stadt in 1553. The family was represented in the Grand Council continuously from 1553 until the 20th century. In the 17th century and early 18th century, the family was the most powerful family of the canton of Basel. Branches of the family were based in Nantes and in the Kingdom of Naples from the 18th century, where it was ennobled as de Bourcard. The family's famous members include the traveller and orientalist Johann Ludwig Burckhardt, the influential art historian Jacob Burckhardt and the international President of the Red Cross, Carl Jacob Burckhardt.

The surname is derived from the dithematic Germanic given name Burkhard, from burg "protection" and hard "brave, hardy".

The Burckhardt coat-of-arms has a shield of yellow background with a black S intertwined with a cross (the “S” is perhaps for Seidenkrämer - silk-merchant), which is surmounted by a crowned helmet with a fluttering black and yellow flag. The original crest was simpler and consisted only of a shield with the S intertwined with the cross. It was modified between 1558 and 1578.

Christoph Burckhardt married Ottilie Mechler in 1518 and in 1539 Gertrud Brand, daughter of Basel mayor Theodor Brand.  There are six lines of the Burckhardt family, from the six sons born of Christoph's second marriage:
Bernhard: line extinct in the 17th century
Hieronymus:
Theodor:
Johann Rudolf
Samuel: 
Daniel

Of the six sons, five became merchants in cloth and silk, while Hieronymus entered the Teutonic Order.
In the 17th and 18th century, the Burckhardts intermarried with the other leading families of the Basel patriciate (Iselin, Merian, Sarasin, Staehelin, Vischer, Von der Mühll, Wettstein). Bernhard was elected to the great chamber of the city council in 1603, where the family remained present until 1878. The family reaches the peak of its political influence in the 18th century, but continues to be influential in the 19th century with several Burckhardt mayors and professors at the University of Basel. Prior to 1798, seven members of the family were burgomasters of Basel, and also in the 19th century, four Burckhardt family members were burgomasters.

The family also appears under the name Byrkit, Byrkett and Burket (its pronunciation in the Basel dialect) in the US where one member of the family was on the Supreme Court of Ohio from 1893 to 1904.

Gallery


Notable family members
Jacob Burckhardt, 1818–1897, Swiss historian of art and culture, author of "The Culture of the Renaissance"
Johann Ludwig Burckhardt (a.k.a. Sheik Ibrahim), 1784–1817, Swiss traveler and orientalist who re-discovered the ancient city of Petra
Carl Jacob Burckhardt, diplomat and President of the Red Cross
Gottlieb Burckhardt, 1836–1907, Swiss psychiatrist and founder of modern psychosurgery
Titus Burckhardt, 1908–1984, Swiss author member of the Traditionalist School
Rudy Burckhardt, 1914–1999, Swiss-American filmmaker and photographer

References

External links 
The Burckhardt Family Book 1490-1890 Released shortly after the 400th anniversary of Christoph Burckhardt's birth in 1890, The Burckhardt Family Book includes 34 plates of portraits of family members from Christoph and Gertrud Burckhardt to a photograph of the 1890 family reunion that took place in Basel on 14 September that year.

Swiss noble families
History of Basel
Patriciate of Basel
Burckhardt family
Surnames from given names

pl:Burckhardt